Nusco is a town and comune in the province of Avellino (Campania region) in the south of Italy, east of Naples, with c. 4,100 inhabitants. It is situated in the mountains between the valleys of the Calore Irpino and Ofanto Rivers.

History 
Hannibal crossed this area during the Punic Wars. As the legend goes, some of Hannibal's elephants became ensconced in the mud of the river to the east. As his elephants drowned the General mourned the death of these great beasts. As such, the river that extends through this valley became known as, and remains, the Ofanto (a corruption of Italian "elefante") River.

The Lombards built in Nusco a castle to defend the valley from the Ofanto river to the Calore one. It played a very important role between Irpinia's people until the 17th century. In the 1656 a plague struck Irpinia killing up to a third of Nusco's population. In addition to its drastic effect on people, the plague irrevocably changed Nusco's social structure. It started to lose its economic power, and until the second half of the 20th century Nusco's history was strictly linked to the history of the Church.

For years the town experienced the poverty and misery of rural towns. Vestiges of feudal relationships left the peasant farmers with little richness. In the late 19th century, families left Nusco for other, wealthier regions of Italy, as well as for new opportunities in South America and the United States. These emigrants from Nusco never forgot their roots. Some of them returned to their homeland.

The earthquake in 1980 did not destroy the most ancient and important buildings.

Main sights 

The Lombard castle (c. 9th century)
The cathedral. The Renaissance portal (1548) was moved to the church of St. Anthony.
The Church of Saint Stephen, holding the remains of Saint Amatus of Nusco. 
The Church of St. Anthony. It stands beneath the remains of the old castle, and just beyond the Superior Gate that allowed entrance into the eastern section of the medieval town.

Twin towns 
 Lanciano, Italy
 Vinci, Italy

People 
 Nicholas Laucella (1882-1952),  Principal Flautist with the New York Philharmonic and the Metropolitan Opera Orchestra 
Ciriaco De Mita (1928-2022), Italian politician who served as Prime Minister of Italy from April 1988 to July 1989.

See also 
 Roman Catholic Archdiocese of Sant’Angelo dei Lombardi–Conza–Nusco–Bisaccia
 Roman Catholic Diocese of Nusco

References

Sources and external links
 Official website

Cities and towns in Campania
Castles in Italy